This Very Moment is a 2003 German film directed by Christoph Hochhäusler.

References

External links

2003 films
2003 drama films
German drama films
2000s German-language films
Films directed by Christoph Hochhäusler
2000s German films